Untilted is the eighth studio album by the British IDM duo Autechre. The record was released 18 April 2005 in Europe and 19 April 2005 in North America by Warp Records, while Beat Records released it in Japan on 9 April 2005. The album charted at #199 in the UK. The cover art for the album was created by Alex Rutterford. 
 
A phony version of the album was leaked on file sharing networks simultaneously with the actual album's promotional leak. It became so  widespread that Sean Booth commented in an interview: "The more fakes the merrier, we’ve released fakes ourselves, but not this time."

Track listing

References

External links
 Untilted at the official Warp discography (features audio clips).

Autechre albums
2005 albums
Warp (record label) albums